Lola Ryan (1925–2003) was an Australian shellworker of Tharawal/Eora descent who lived in La Perouse. Her work is in the permanent collections of several Australian museums.

Biography 
Ryan, who was of Tharawal/Eora descent, lived in La Perouse and learned shellworking from her family. Ryan often worked with her sister, Mavis Longbottom. Ryan and her sister, Longbottom, started selling their work as children. The sisters would collect shells from Yarra Beach and other areas along the coast of New South Wales.

Work 
Ryan's work is often brightly coloured, "encrusted" and scaled for use as art in the home. She began to work with art collector, Peter Fay, in the late 1990s. She started showing her work in galleries around the same time and in 2001, she showed her work at Gitte Weise's Gallery.

Ryan's work is in the collections of the National Gallery of Australia, the Art Gallery of New South Wales, the Lawrence Wilson Art Gallery, the Australian National Maritime Museum, the Museum of Contemporary Art, and the Museum of Applied Arts & Sciences.

References

External links 
Lola Ryan and Mavis Longbottom Demonstrating the Art of Shellwork (1987)

1925 births
2003 deaths
Australian women artists
Indigenous Australian artists
People from New South Wales
Australian artisans
Shell artists
Artists from New South Wales